The Magistrates' Association is the membership organisation for magistrates in England and Wales. By virtue of its education and training functions it is a charitable organisation and is funded by its members to promote the magistracy.

History
The idea of forming an association of magistrates came from a Derby magistrate, Alderman Wilkins, in 1920. The inaugural meeting of the association was held at Central Hall, Westminster, on 28 October 1921. Lord Haldane was elected the association's first president. Thereafter the Lord Chancellor of the day was president, but when the role of the Lord Chancellor changed with the passing of the Constitutional Reform Act 2005 the Lord Chief Justice took on the role.

By 1945, membership had grown to 5,288 members, and it had 16,354 at its fiftieth Anniversary in 1970. Today, it represents over 80% of active magistrates.

It received a royal charter in October 1962.

Objectives

The association was established to:
"promote the sound administration of the law by educating and instructing magistrates and others in the law, the administration of justice, the treatment of offenders and the best methods of preventing crime; and promoting discussion on developments in the law and the administration of justice."

Since 1969, it has helped to develop various sentencing guidelines. It also organises conferences and publishes a magazine, Magistrate. Members also participate in local branch activities.

The governing body is the Board of Trustees. A Council advises the Board. Various standing committees are populated by association members and focus on specific areas of magistrates' activities.

The current chair is Bev Higgs JP.

Publications

The association publishes a magazine, Magistrate (formerly The Magistrate), several times each year. It has also issued a number of reports which are available from its website. A book The Magistracy at the Crossroads was published by Waterside Press in 2012.

Arms

References

External links
 

 
 
Charities based in London
Criminal justice
1921 establishments in the United Kingdom
Organizations established in 1921